In many countries, combat engineers are members of broader military engineering corps or branches. Examples of this include:

 Royal Australian Engineers
 Canadian Military Engineers
 Indian Army Corps of Engineers
 Indonesian Army Corps of Engineers
 Jihad of Construction (defunct)
 Engineer Corps (Ireland)
 Combat Engineering Corps 
 Corps of Royal New Zealand Engineers
 Pakistan Army Corps of Engineers
 Russian Engineer Troops
 Sri Lanka Engineers
 Royal Engineers
 United States Army Corps of Engineers
 United States Navy Seabee
 United States Air Force RED HORSE
 United States Marine Corps Combat Engineers
 South African Engineer Corps

Combat engineering
Military engineering